The List of Florida Gators basketball players in WNBA includes former members of the Florida Gators women's basketball team that represents the University of Florida who have played professionally for a Women's National Basketball Association (WNBA) team in one or more regular season games.  This list includes former Florida Gators women's basketball players who are retired or currently active WNBA professionals.

See also 

 List of Florida Gators men's basketball players in the NBA
 List of University of Florida alumni
 List of University of Florida Athletic Hall of Fame members
 List of University of Florida Olympians

References

External links 

 Women's basketball team

Florida Gators
 
Basketball WNBA